The Banking Act of 1935 passed on August 19, 1935 and was signed into law by the president, Franklin D. Roosevelt, on August 23. The Act changed the structure and power distribution in the Federal Reserve System that began with the Banking Act of 1933.  The Act contained three titles.

Title I 
Title I amended section 12B of the 1933 Act with regards to the creation of the Federal Deposit Insurance Corporation (FDIC) and its duties. The board of directors of the FDIC would include the Comptroller of Currency and two members selected by the President and confirmed by the Senate.  They shall hold a term of 6 years and receive an annual salary of $10,000. Title I also established the maximum insured deposit to be $5,000.

FDIC 
The Act of 1935 made the FDIC permanent, and included the following provisions:
 All accounts would be insured up to $5,000. At this time 98.5% of all deposits were under the $5,000 limit. This was a dramatic change from the initial guidelines under the 1933 act.
 All banks who were insured under the initial creation of the FDIC are still insured under the new permanent program.  All Federal Reserve member banks are required to participate in the FDIC.  Smaller state banks, national banks who were not members of the Federal Reserve System, savings and loan institutions and other similar organizations had differing requirements for participation.
 All banks who participated in the FDIC were able to advertise and place signage in their business stating that the deposits (up to $5,000) were insured by the FDIC. These signs are still displayed at local banks.

Title II

Board of Governors 
Title II (in section 203 of the Act) changed the name of the "Federal Reserve Board" to the "Board of Governors of the Federal Reserve System." The board consists of seven members selected by the President with advise and consent of the Senate. Each member would serve a fourteen year term on the Board.  Of those selected one member would be selected as chairman and one as vice-chairman each serving four years in that capacity.

Federal Open Market Committee 
Title II also creates a Federal Open Market Committee (FOMC) The membership of this committee will include the governors of the Federal Reserve System and five representatives of the Federal Reserve banks. The Committee meets quarterly in Washington DC.  The FOMC controls how and when Reserve Banks participate in open market operations.  All such decisions go through the FOMC.

Loans to member banks 
The Act renewed the ability of each Federal Reserve bank to make loans to its member banks. The rates for these loans must be 0.5% above the current discount rate at the Federal Reserve.

Title III 
Title III included 46 sections of technical amendments that clarified banking legislation. These included but were not limited to the rules of stock ownership, elimination of double liability, surplus requirements, rules for loans to executives, rules of branch banking, rules of securities transactions and the rights of shareholders.

Origin 
For a few years, there had been growing desire for changes to be made to the Federal Reserve Act. In 1934 Jacob Viner, was an assistant to the Treasury Secretary Henry Morgenthau, Jr. Viner chaired a committee tasked with determining what changes were needed to update the Federal Reserve Act. Marriner Stoddard Eccles became the governor of the Federal Reserve Board on November 15, 1934. He immediately dismissed the token reforms put forth by Viner and the committee. Eccles insisted that the two main goals of the new legislation were to "control speculation" and to "promote the stability of employment and business". To make this happen, Eccles also wanted the Federal Reserve to become the Central Bank with concentrated power.

Eccles proposed four key points to be included in the new legislation:
 Change the title and approval process for the bank's heads;
 Create a central committee of board members and bank governors to control open market operations;
 Place the board in control of paper specification; and
 Ease controls on real estate lending.

Legislation 
On February 5, 1935, the "Administration banking bill", as it was initially titled, was given to the House Committee on Banking and Currency. It passed the House (271-110) very quickly and with all main points intact.

In the Senate, the bill faced stiffer criticism, specifically from Carter Glass. The main sticking point was who was to have the most control, the bankers or the politicians. The bill that eventually passed the Senate was a compromise. The Act was signed into law by Franklin D. Roosevelt on August 23, 1935.

References

External links 

 Banking Act of 1935
United States federal banking legislation